Dahisar metro station (East) is a station of Mumbai metro. The station is located in an elevated position on Western Express Highway in North Mumbai. It serves as a station on Mumbai metro line 2A. The station was inaugurated on 2 April 2022.

The station is owned by the Mumbai Metropolitan Region Development Authority.

History 
Trial runs on section of 2A from Dhanukarwadi to Dahisar East has started from 31 May 2021. Dahisar East commercial operations began on 3 April 2022 with First phase of line 2A.

Station

structure 
Dahisar metro station (East) is an elevated metro station on line 2A of the Mumbai metro. The station has total 3 levels. Station entrances and exits begin or end at the first level or ground level. The second level or mezzanine level houses the station's fare control center, station agents, metro card vending machines, crossovers etc. The third level or final level contains the platforms and rail tracks.

Platform 
Dahisar metro station (East) has 2 side platforms. The side platforms are connected to each other through the second level or mezzanine level of the stations. Both platforms have platform screen doors.

Power and Signaling System 
Like all other stations and railways of Mumbai metro, Valnai station also uses 25,000 volt AC power system by overhead catenary to operate the trains.

References 

Mumbai Metro stations